Michael J. Mauboussin (born February 1964) heads consilient research at Morgan Stanley division Morgan Stanley Investment Management's Counterpoint Global, an open-end mutual fund. Previously, he was director of research at BlueMountain Capital and head of global financial strategies at Credit Suisse, where he advised clients on valuation and portfolio positioning, capital markets theory, competitive strategy analysis, and decision making. He is also an adjunct professor of finance at the Columbia Business School and serves as chairman emeritus of the board of trustees at the Santa Fe Institute, a multi-disciplinary research center for complex adaptive systems, after serving as its chairman from 2012 until retiring in May 2021.

Career
Mauboussin first joined Credit Suisse First Boston (CSFB) in 1992 as a packaged food industry analyst and later served as its managing director and chief U.S. investment strategist. He worked as a chief investment strategist at Legg Mason Capital Management from 2004 until leaving the firm in 2013, to rejoin Credit Suisse.

He is the former president of the Consumer Analyst Group of New York and has been "repeatedly named to Institutional Investor’s All-America Research Team and The Wall Street Journal All-Star survey".

During a February 2021 interview by The Economic Times, Mauboussin, noted as “one of Wall Street’s most creative and influential minds," stated that speculators now outnumbered investors in the marketplace.

Personal life
He has a B.A. in government from Georgetown University. He is a resident of Darien, Connecticut.

Publications
Mauboussin's writing has been featured in publications such as NPR, The Wall Street Journal, Fortune, Forbes, and SmartMoney.

Works
 The Success Equation: Untangling Skill and Luck in Business, Sports, and Investing Harvard Business Review Press, 2012
 Think Twice: Harnessing the Power of Counterintuition Harvard Business School Press, 2009
 More Than You Know: Finding Financial Wisdom in Unconventional Places Columbia University Press, 2006
 Expectations Investing: Reading Stock Prices for Better Returns, co-author with Alfred Rappaport; Harvard Business School Press, 2001
 Thirty Years: Reflections on the Ten Attributes of Great Investors, 2021

References

External links and references
michaelmauboussin.com
Faculty Page, gsb.Columbia.edu
Profile, businessweek.com
Interview, forbes.com
Interview, seekingalpha.com
Michael Mauboussin Resource Page, ritholtz.com

Living people
Financial economists
Georgetown University alumni
Columbia University faculty
Columbia Business School faculty
Real options
American economics writers
American male non-fiction writers
American finance and investment writers
1964 births
Santa Fe Institute people